RDKit is open-source toolkit for cheminformatics.  It was developed by Greg Landrum with numerous additional contributions from the RDKit open source community.  It has an application programming interface (API) for Python, Java, C++, and C#.

References 

Python (programming language) scientific libraries
Computational chemistry software